The Daguerre Memorial is a bronze sculpture by Jonathan Scott Hartley in Washington, D.C. It was erected in memory of Louis Daguerre.

Description 
Erected at the instigation of the Professional Photographers of America (PPA), a worldwide trade association of professional photographers, Daguerre Memorial was dedicated on 15 August 1890 at the Arts and Industries Building first. It was moved outside, where it remained from 1897 to 1969.
It was re-dedicated in 1989.
Daguerre Memorial is located at the Old Patent Office Building, home to the Smithsonian American Art Museum and the National Portrait Gallery, on 7th Street N.W., Washington, D.C.

The inscriptions read:
 (Side of granite base:)

 PHOTOGRAPHY, THE ELECTRIC TELEGRAPH, AND THE STEAM ENGINE ARE THE THREE GREAT DISCOVERIES OF THE AGE.
 NO FIVE CENTURIES IN HUMAN PROGRESS CAN SHOW SUCH STRIDES AS THESE.
 (Side of granite base:)
 TO COMMEMORATE THE FIRST HALF-CENTURY IN PHOTOGRAPHY 1839–1889. ERECTED BY THE PHOTOGRAPHER'S ASSOCIATION OF AMERICA, AUGUST, 1890.
 (Front of granite base, just below bust:)
 DAGUERRE

See also
 List of public art in Washington, D.C., Ward 2

References

External links
DC Memorialist: Daguerre Memorial

Sculptures of the Smithsonian Institution
Statues in Washington, D.C.
1890 sculptures
Allegorical sculptures in Washington, D.C.
Outdoor sculptures in Washington, D.C.
Bronze sculptures in Washington, D.C.
Monuments and memorials in Washington, D.C.
Sculptures of men in Washington, D.C.
Sculptures of women in Washington, D.C.
1890s establishments in Washington, D.C.
Penn Quarter